Helen M. Roe  (18 December 1895 – 28 May 1988), was an Irish librarian and antiquary, a champion of medieval Irish art and iconography.

Early life and education
Born in 1895, Helen Maybury Roe was the daughter of William Ernest Roe and Anne Lambert Sheilds of Mountrath, Laois. Her grandfather was Francis Henry Sheilds of Parsonstown, owner of the King's County Chronicle. She was sent first to the local primary school and then to the Preston School in Abbeyleix. Although she attended Trinity College, Dublin, she didn't begin her career due to the outbreak of World War I. She joined the St John's Ambulance Brigade and served at the Cambridge Military Hospital and at Aldershot Barracks. In the immediate aftermath she continued her medical career with the Military Hospital in Bray, County Wicklow. She also spent time touring in Europe visiting museums and beginning her appreciation for medieval art. Roe had been raised Protestant and had done her duty as part of the aristocracy by serving in the war. But the soldiers had treated her as Irish and abused her especially during the Easter rising. The result was that Roe supported nationalism from then on. She went back to TCD and completed her degree in modern languages in 1921. She finally completed her M.A. in 1924 and began a teaching career. She spent time working in The Royal School, Dungannon, and Alexandra College, Dublin.

Career
In 1926 her parents needed her and she returned home. In 1926, she became the County Librarian in Laois. While working as a librarian Roe was able to study further and, as a rare person with a car, she toured sites and visited schools. One result of her presentations to schools was to inspire Ireland’s first female archaeologist, Ellen Prendergast. In 1940 Roe retired from the library and moved to Dublin where she was able to buy a house and garden. Apart from her antiquarian work she was a regular supporter of charities and was honorary secretary of The Queen's County Protestant Orphan's Society and actively involved in The Dublin University Mission to Chota Nagpur, India.

Roe became a regular contributor to various journals and newspapers including Journal of the Royal Society of Antiquaries of Ireland, An Leabharlann, Béaloideas, Seanchas Ard Mhacha, Carloviana, the Irish Press and the Leinster Express. From 1965 until 1968 Roe served as the president of the Royal Society of Antiquaries of Ireland, first woman to be elected. She was elected to be a member of the Royal Irish Academy in 1984. Roe continued touring and lecturing into her nineties.
She lived at Oak House, Sussex Road, Dublin and was buried at St. Peter's Churchyard, Mountrath, County Laois, Ireland. The RSAI have an annual lecture in her honour and have named one of their lecture rooms after her.

Bibliography

 The high crosses of Kells
 Medieval Fonts of Meath
 The cult of St. Michael in Ireland

External resources

 Rory O’Farrell and Christine Bromwich, "Helen M. Roe (1895-1988)" in Jane Chance (ed.), Women Medievalists and the Academy (Madison, WI: University of Wisconsin Press, 2005), 461.
 Andrew O’Brien, "Roe, Helen Maybury," in James McGuire and James Quinn (eds.), Dictionary of Irish Biography (Cambridge: Cambridge University Press, 2009). 
 "Official Opening of the Helen Roe Theatre 21 January 1993", The Journal of the Royal Society of Antiquaries of Ireland 122 (1992), 155
 A collection of Helen Maybury Roe’s papers from this period are held in the Laois County Archives. 
 "Obituary: Ellen M. Prendergast", The Irish Times, 24 May 1999. 
 A partial bibliography of Helen Roe’s writings can be found at RI-Opac.
 Helen M. Roe, "The "David Cycle" in Early Irish Art", The Journal of the Royal Society of Antiquaries of Ireland 79:1/2 (1949), 39-59.
 Helen M. Roe, "Some Aspects of Medieval Culture in Ireland", The Journal of the Royal Society of Antiquaries of Ireland 96:2 (1966), 105-09.
 H.A.K., "Helen Maybury Roe", Archaeology Ireland 2:3 (1988), 86; O’Farrell and Bromwich, "Roe", 465.

References

1895 births
1988 deaths
20th-century Irish women writers
Irish archaeologists
Irish women archaeologists
Irish antiquarians
Irish librarians
Women librarians
20th-century archaeologists
20th-century antiquarians